Paraplatyptilia optata is a moth of the family Pterophoridae that is known from Japan (Kyushu) and Korea.

References

External links
Taxonomic And Biological Studies Of Pterophoridae Of Japan (Lepidoptera)
Japanese Moths

Moths described in 1963
optata
Moths of Asia
Moths of Japan